Cranford Community College is a secondary school with academy status in the London Borough of Hounslow, England.

History
The school first opened as Woodfield Secondary School.  After the 1944 Education Act, Spring Grove Central School and the council senior schools became secondary modern schools. The Hounslow Heath secondary school was closed and its buildings were transferred to the neighbouring primary school when the Woodfield secondary modern school was opened in 1954 at the Great South West Road. Cranford Community College was officially opened in 1975.

The headteacher currently is Mr. Kevin Prunty.

Year 7, 8, 9, 10, 11 years in Cranford Community College. Each year is divided into form T U, V, W, X, Y and Z respectively.

Facilities
Two purpose built study centres with 150 computers and additional learning resources available from 8.15am to 5.00pm are available at Cranford Community College. Year 12 have their own study centre and study centre manager who is available to help students with their research, learning, UCAS, Higher Education and employment applications. The sports facilities, drama studios, music practice rooms, dining hall, and media room are also available for use.

Use in television
In 2014, Cranford Community College was a filming location for the British TV series PREMature. The school in the series goes by the fictional name Karl M. Community College. It is the first drama series to be filmed at the school.

References

External links
Cranford Community College
Cranford Review (Publications)

Academies in the London Borough of Hounslow
Educational institutions established in 1975
Secondary schools in the London Borough of Hounslow
1975 establishments in England